Kung Fu Tootsie ( or Tat soo foot) is a 2007 Thai action comedy film written and directed by Jaturong Mokjok.

Title
The English title of the film is an allusion to the 1982 American comedy film Tootsie. A Thai slang term for transvestite or effeminate man, toot (ตุ๊ด), comes from the first syllable of Tootsie. The Thai name of the film, Tat soo foot is a Thai spoonerism for toot soo fat, which translates roughly as "butt-kicking sissy".

Plot
Kung Fu Tootsie is set in Hong Kong, the story of Tien and Tao, twins separated at birth. When Tao, living with his wealthy mafioso father, Ma Yong Hai, is mutilated by a rival gang, Ma must find his lost son Tien, living in poverty with his mother, to become the next head of the family.

Antics ensue, however, when Tien turns out to be more 'Sonny and Cher' than 'Sonny Corleone'.

Cast
 Sittichai Pabchompoo (Boy) as Tien
 Koti Arambawy as Kaytree
 Jim Chuancheun as Mha-yonghai
 Erik Markus Schuetz as Mr. Jonas
 Jaturong Mokjok as Foey
 Kreangsak Riantong as Sienpau
 Pokchat Thiamchai (Jip) as Poey-Poey
 Note Chern-Yim
 Tanai Sripinyo

External links
 

2007 films
GMM Tai Hub films
Thai-language films
Thai LGBT-related films
Transgender-related films
2007 action comedy films
Thai action comedy films
2007 LGBT-related films
2007 comedy films
LGBT-related comedy films